Lucien Prival (July 14, 1901 – June 3, 1994) was an American film actor. He appeared in more than 70 films between 1926 and 1953.

Born in New York City, Prival was the son of a French mother and a Russian father. From 1912-1919 he lived with his family in Berlin. After returning to New York, Lucien worked as a salesman in an art store until he was able to land a small role on the stage. He signed with First National Pictures.

Partial filmography

 Puppets (1926) - Frank
 The Great Deception (1926) - Von Markow
 A Man of Quality (1926) - Spanish Joe
 High Hat (1927) - Minor Role
 The Patent Leather Kid (1927) - The German Officer
 American Beauty (1927, lost film) - Gillespie
 The Racket (1928) - Chick
 Adoration (1928) - Baron
 The Peacock Fan (1929) - Dr. Change Dorfman
 Party Girl (1930) - Paul Newcast
 In the Next Room (1930) - French Exporter
 Hell's Angels (1930) - Baron Von Kranz
 The Last of the Lone Wolf (1930) - Varril
 Lotus Lady (1930) - Castro
 The Princess and the Plumber (1930) - Baron von Kemper
 Young Sinners (1931) - Baron von Konitz
 The World and the Flesh (1932) - Cossack (uncredited)
 Hollywood Speaks (1932) - Frederick Landau
 Western Limited (1932) - Benoit
 Sherlock Holmes (1932) - Hans Dreiaugen (uncredited)
 Secrets of the French Police (1932) - Lomzoi
 Grand Slam (1933) - Gregory (uncredited)
 Reunion in Vienna (1933) - Colline - Waiter (uncredited)
 The Sphinx (1933) - Jenks, the Butler
 Storm at Daybreak (1933) - Hungarian Soldier (uncredited)
 After Tonight (1933) - Lt. Erlich
 The Crime of Helen Stanley (1934) - Gibson
 All Men Are Enemies (1934) - Chief (uncredited)
 The Return of Chandu (1934, Serial) - Vindhyan - High Priest [Chs. 1-4]
 The Merry Widow (1934) - Adamovitch (uncredited)
 Sweepstake Annie (1935) - Temperamental Director (uncredited)
 Bride of Frankenstein (1935) - Butler
 Born to Gamble (1935) - Al Schultz
 Champagne for Breakfast (1935) - Bates
 Darkest Africa (1936, Serial) - Dagna
 The Sky Parade (1936) - Secretary (uncredited)
 History Is Made at Night (1937) - Private Detective
 Trapped by G-Men (1937) - Franzy
 High Flyers (1937) - Mr. Panzer
 Every Day's a Holiday (1937) - Danny the Dip
 Mr. Wong, Detective (1938) - Anton Mohl
 Paris Honeymoon (1939) - Mug (uncredited)
 Confessions of a Nazi Spy (1939) - Kranz (uncredited)
 Nurse Edith Cavell (1939) - Lt. Schmidt
 Espionage Agent (1939) - Decker
 Hitler – Beast of Berlin (1939) - Sachs
 The Mortal Storm (1940) - Passport Official on Train (uncredited)
 King of the Royal Mounted (1940, Serial) - Johnson [Ch. 1]
 Sky Murder (1940) - Brucker
 The Great Dictator (1940) - Storm Trooper Officer (uncredited)
 South of Panama (1941) - Raynor
 Man Hunt (1941) - Umbrella Henchman
 King of the Texas Rangers (1941, Serial) - Zeppelin Captain [Chs. 1,3,6,10,11,12]
 The Secret Code (1942, Serial) - U-499 Commander [Chs.4,15]
 Panama Hattie (1942) - Hans (uncredited)
 Assignment in Brittany (1943) - Maj. von Pless
 Hangmen Also Die! (1943) - Policeman (uncredited)
 Submarine Base (1943) - Capt. Mueller - German Submarine
 Hostages (1943) - German Officer in Officers' Club (uncredited)
 Storm Over Lisbon (1944) - Man in Tails (uncredited)
 The Falcon's Alibi (1946) - Baron
 On Our Merry Way (1948) - Jackson (uncredited)
 So This Is New York (1948) - Waiter (uncredited)
 Bodyguard (1948) - Peter the Butler (uncredited)
 High Noon (1952) - Joe - Ramirez Saloon Bartender (uncredited)

References

External links

1901 births
1994 deaths
20th-century American male actors
American male film actors
American male silent film actors
Male actors from New York City